Sanpada College of Commerce and Technology, commonly known as 'SCCT, is a college located in Sanpada, Navi Mumbai, India. It was founded by the Oriental Education Society in 2004.

It is located near Sanpada Railway station (Harbor Line). SCCT shares a building with the Oriental College of Pharmacy. The current principal of SCCT college is  Prof. Raosaheb Shindegalwekar . The SCCT College is affiliated to the University of Mumbai.

Courses offered
Graduation Courses: (Affiliated to University of Mumbai)
Bachelor of Management Studies (B.M.S.)
Bachelor of Mass Media (B.M.M.)
Bachelor Of Science – Computer Science 
Bachelor Of Science – Information Technology (B. Sc.- IT)
Bachelor of Commerce (B. Com.)
Bachelor of Accounting & Finance (B. A. F.)
Bachelor of Banking & Insurance (B. B &I )
Junior College (11th/12th): (Maharashtra State Board)
F.Y.J.C. – Commerce and Science
S.Y.J.C. – Commerce and Science

References

External links
 SCCT Web site

Education in Navi Mumbai
Colleges in India